Point Atkinson Lighthouse is a lighthouse erected on Point Atkinson, a headland in southwestern British Columbia named by Captain George Vancouver in 1792, when he was exploring the Pacific Northwest in the ship Discovery. The first wooden lighthouse went into service in 1875 and was replaced by a reinforced concrete structure in 1914.

History
The first lighthouse at the site was a wooden structure with an attached keeper's house, built by Arthur Finney of Nanaimo in 1874. It did not go into service until the following year because initially the wrong light was sent from England. The beacon was lit for the first time 17 March 1875.

When the visibility was poor,  ship captains would sound their foghorn three times, prompting the lightkeeper to pump a horn by hand until the vessel signalled that it was safe to desist.

In 1889, Canadian Pacific Steamships demanded that a fog alarm be added. This was located in a separate building to the west of the lighthouse. It had a rotating drum which was driven by steam to make an audible sound. In 1902, this was replaced by a diaphone fog alarm in which a slotted piston moved inside a similarly slotted cylinder.

The present lighthouse was built in 1914 on granite boulders jutting out into Burrard Inlet in West Vancouver, Canada. The concrete structure was considered at the time innovative in lighthouse design. It is now automated and still in use.

The Point Atkinson Lighthouse may be reached by hiking the Valley Trail in Lighthouse Park.

Keepers
Edward Woodward 1874–1877 
Robert G. Wellwood 1877–1880 
Walter Erwin 1880–1910 
Thomas David Grafton 1910–1933 
Lawrence Walter Grafton 1933–1935 
Ernest Charles Dawe 1935–1961 
Gordon Odlum 1961–1976 
James Barr 1976–1978 
Oscar Edwards 1978–1980 
Gerald D. Watson 1980–1996 
Donald Graham 1980–1996

See also
 List of lighthouses in British Columbia
 List of lighthouses in Canada
Lighthouse Park
List of national historic sites of Canada
Henri de Miffonis
Brockton Point

References

External links

 Aids to Navigation Canadian Coast Guard

Lighthouses completed in 1875
Lighthouses in British Columbia
Lighthouses on the National Historic Sites of Canada register
West Vancouver
National Historic Sites in British Columbia